Jack Webster may refer to:

 Jack Webster (journalist) (1918–1999), Scottish-born Canadian journalist, radio and television personality
 Jack Webster (police officer) (1923–2002), police officer, administrator and police historian in Toronto, Canada
 Jack Webster (cricketer) (1917–1997), English cricketer
 Jack Webster (Coronation Street), a character on the TV series Coronation Street
 Jack Webster (rower) (1917-2005), Australian Olympic rower

See also 
 John Webster (disambiguation)